The 1992–93 Winnipeg Jets season was the Jets' 21st season, their 14th in the National Hockey League (NHL). The Jets qualified for the playoffs, losing in the first round. Winnipeg was not shut out in any of their regular-season games or playoff games.

Offseason
On June 20, 1992, the Jets and Chicago Blackhawks made a trade at the 1992 NHL Entry Draft, as the Jets acquired the Blackhawks 17th and 27th overall picks for the Jets 12th and 36th overall picks.  With their first round, 17th overall pick at the draft, Winnipeg selected Sergei Bautin from Dynamo Moscow. Bautin, a defenceman, had 1 goal and 4 points in 37 games with Dynamo. Other notable players the Jets selected in the draft included Boris Mironov in the second round, and Nikolai Khabibulin in the ninth round.

The club announced 1988 NHL Entry Draft first-round draft pick Teemu Selanne would join the Jets for the 1992–93 season. He had 39 goals and 62 points in 44 games with Jokerit of the Finnish SM-liiga in 1991–92. He also played for Finland at the 1992 Winter Olympics in Albertville, France, scoring 8 goals and 11 points in 7 games.

On August 24, 1992, Winnipeg traded defenceman Shawn Cronin to the Quebec Nordiques in exchange for Dan Lambert. Lambert had 6 goals and 15 points in 28 games with the Nordiques in the 1991–92 season.

Late in training camp, on October 1, 1992, the Jets traded goaltender Stephane Beauregard to the Philadelphia Flyers in exchange for future considerations. The same day, Winnipeg traded Pat Elyniuk to the Washington Capitals in exchange for John Druce and the Capitals' fourth-round pick in the 1993 NHL Entry Draft.  Druce had 19 goals and 37 points in 67 games with the Capitals in 1991–92, while Elyniuk was coming off a 25-goal and 50-points in 60 games with Winnipeg in 1991–92.

Regular season
Troy Murray was traded in February, and replaced as captain by defenceman Dean Kennedy.

The Jets scored the fewest short-handed goals in the NHL, with three.

Final standings

Schedule and results

Playoffs
The Jets faced the Smythe Division champion, the Vancouver Canucks in the Division Semi-Finals. The Canucks defeated the Jets in six games.

Player statistics

Regular season
Scoring

Goaltending

Playoffs
Scoring

Goaltending

Awards and records

Transactions

Trades

Waivers

Free agents

Draft picks
Winnipeg's draft picks at the 1992 NHL Entry Draft held at the Montreal Forum in Montreal, Quebec.

Farm teams

See also
 1992–93 NHL season

References

External links

Winnipeg Jets season, 1992-93
Winnipeg Jets (1972–1996) seasons
Winn